Superior auricular may refer to:

 Superior auricular ligament
 Superior auricular muscle